James Belfer is an American independent film and TV producer. He is the founder and CEO of Cartuna, the founder and CEO of Dogfish Pictures, and the founder and managing director of Dogfish Accelerator.

Early life
Belfer grew up on Long Island, New York. He received his Bachelor's Degree from Northwestern University in 2009. That year, Belfer founded Dogfish Pictures to finance and produce several feature films per year.  He attended NYU Stern in 2011 to receive his MBA in Entrepreneurship and Innovation, Digital Marketing, and Business Analytics. He was also an Associate for the 2012 Boulder Class of TechStars and an investor in the MESA+ venture fund.  In 2012, he created Dogfish Accelerator, the first accelerator program for independent film producers. He currently resides in New York City.

Film career
Belfer has produced and financed several films, including The Romantics (co-producer), Salvation Boulevard (co-producer), Like Crazy (associate producer), Vamps (co-executive producer), Compliance (executive producer), and Prince Avalanche (producer).  He is currently an adjunct professor at NYU's Tisch School of the Arts, teaching strategies for independent filmmaking to undergraduates in Film & Television. In 2015 Belfer alongside Adam Belfer founded the animation studio Cartuna.

Filmography

Festivals
Belfer's films have participated in the Sundance Film Festival, Toronto International Film Festival, Berlin International Film Festival, South by Southwest, Locarno International Film Festival, BAMcinemaFest, Seattle International Film Festival, San Francisco International Film Festival, and Stockholm International Film Festival.  In 2011, Belfer's film Like Crazy won the Grand Jury Prize: Dramatic at the Sundance Film Festival. In 2013, Belfer’s film Prince Avalanche premiered at the Sundance Film Festival and won the 2013 Berlinale Silver Bear Award for Best Director.

Honors
In 2012, Belfer was named "Ten Producers To Keep Watching" by Deadline Hollywood.

References

External links
 

Living people
American film producers
1987 births
Northwestern University alumni
New York University Stern School of Business alumni
American chief executives